Heritage Services preserves the material and cultural heritage of Halton Region, and acquires and shares knowledge of the region’s historical and natural world. Based at Kelso Conservation Area in Milton, Ontario, Canada, Heritage Services offers seasonal on-site and travelling exhibits and public programming. Heritage Services support the preservation and appreciation of the heritage of Halton Region through partnerships with museums, archives, historical societies, cultural organizations and attractions.

The Halton County Museum was founded in 1961. In 1974 it became the responsibility of the Region when the new Regional Municipality of Halton was formed. In 2014, Regional Council adopted a new Master Plan for the Museum under which it was transformed into Heritage Services, which supports regional heritage organizations and institutions, and cares for Regionally owned heritage assets. At the end of 2016, the Halton Region Museum site in the Kelso Conservation Area closed and is no longer open to the public.

Today, the facility is still used for staff offices, workshops and collections storage and research services are available by appointment.

References

External links
Halton Region Heritage Services - official site

History museums in Ontario
Milton, Ontario
Museums in the Regional Municipality of Halton